Boyd Atkins (1900 – March 1, 1965) was an American jazz and blues reed player. He played saxophone and violin professionally.

Atkins was born in Paducah, Kentucky, United States.

Atkins played with the Fate Marable band touring on the Mississippi River in the late 1910s. He was on the St. Louis, Missouri musical scene with the band of Dewey Jackson early in the 1920s. Following this Atkins moved to Chicago and led his own band which included Kid Ory. He also worked with Earl Hines and Carroll Dickerson. In 1927, Atkins joined Louis Armstrong's band at the Sunset Cafe in Chicago, where he played clarinet along with soprano and alto saxophone. Armstrong's band played Atkins' most famous tune, "Heebie Jeebies". Later in the 1920s he again led his own band, The Firecrackers.

Between 1931 and 1934 he played with Eli Rice, and became a bandleader in Minneapolis in the middle of the decade. He also played with Rook Ganz there. In 1940 he fronted the Society Swingsters in Peoria, Illinois. He was back in Chicago by 1951, and in the 1950s he took more work as an arranger, and played more often with blues musicians such as Elmore James and Magic Sam.

Atkins died in Cook County, Illinois, on March 1, 1965.

Some details of Atkins' life are obscure, with his full date of birth unknown.

References

External links

[ Boyd Atkins] at Allmusic
New Orleans Jazz, a Family Album by Al Rose and Edmond Souchon, Louisiana State University Press, 1967, ASIN: B000XTSVGS
 Life magazine interview with Kid Ory, 20 April 1957

American jazz saxophonists
American male saxophonists
American jazz clarinetists
Jazz musicians from New Orleans
African-American jazz musicians
1900 births
1965 deaths
20th-century American saxophonists
20th-century American male musicians
American male jazz musicians
20th-century African-American musicians